The Subprefecture of Jabaquara is one of 32 subprefectures of the city of São Paulo, Brazil.  It comprises one district: Jabaquara.

References

Subprefectures of São Paulo